The Division of Nicholls is an Australian Electoral Division in the state of Victoria, which was contested for the first time at the 2019 federal election.

Geography
Federal electoral division boundaries in Australia are determined at redistributions by a redistribution committee appointed by the Australian Electoral Commission. Redistributions occur for the boundaries of divisions in a particular state, and they occur every seven years, or sooner if a state's representation entitlement changes or when divisions of a state are malapportioned.

History

The division is named in honour of Sir Douglas and Lady Gladys Nicholls, in recognition of their contributions to the advocacy of Aboriginal rights.

The Division of Nicholls was created in 2019 after the Australian Electoral Commission oversaw a mandatory redistribution of divisions in Victoria. Nicholls replaced the Division of Murray in the same location. It is located in the north of the state, adjoining the Murray River, which forms Victoria's border with New South Wales and includes the towns of Shepparton, Yarrawonga, Seymour, Echuca and Broadford.

Prior to the 2019 election the seat was notionally held by the National Party on a margin of 22.3%, making it a very safe seat for the party. Its predecessor had been safely conservative for nearly its entire existence since its creation in 1949, with the Liberal Party and the National Party holding it for long spells. Indeed, much of this region has been held by a conservative party since Federation; the area was part of the Division of Echuca from 1901 to 1937, then Indi from 1937 to 1949.

The final member for Murray, Damian Drum of the Nationals, followed most of his constituents into Nicholls and easily retained it, albeit with a small swing against him.

Members

Election results

References

External links
 Division of Nicholls – Australian Electoral Commission

Electoral divisions of Australia
Constituencies established in 2019
2019 establishments in Australia
Shepparton
Shire of Moira
Shire of Mitchell